Md. A. Khaleq is a Bangladesh Nationalist Party politician and the former Member of Parliament of Mymensingh-7.

Career
Khaleq was elected to parliament from Mymensingh-7 as a Bangladesh Nationalist Party candidate in 1991.

References

Bangladesh Nationalist Party politicians
Living people
5th Jatiya Sangsad members
Year of birth missing (living people)